C.C.W.M.T.T (abbreviated as Can't Come with Me This Time) is the fourth studio album by Canadian rapper and producer Sean Leon. It was released as an audio-film and an album on November 29, 2017. The album was supported by two singles, "Gold" and "Vintage".

Background 
On September 24, 2017, Leon released a track titled "Vintage" as the first single of a supposed upcoming extended play titled I Can See a Blue Sky from Here. "Vintage" had previously been included in a short film released on YouTube by Leon titled Life When You're the Movie, as early as December 21, 2016, when its first trailer was released.

In an interview with The Fader, Leon said about the album:

Track listing

Notes
 "Parkdale Cartel Freestyle II", "King St. W", "2017" and "25 & Whylin" contains vocals from Bijan Amir.
 "25 & Whyln" includes "Steve Harvey / Family Feud" and "Hollywood Tarantino Flow", performed by Sean Leon, and contains vocals from A L L I E.

Personnel

 Sean Leon - Vocals, executive production and production
 Jack Rochon - Production
 WondaGurl - Production
 Eestbound - Production
 Bijan Amir - Vocals and production
 TAIYIM - Production
 MADEAT2AM - Production
 LUHJÉ - Production
 FrancisGotHeat - Production
 Jandre Amos - Additional production
 Luis Mora - Photography
 Lila - Photography
 Niko Nice - Photography
 Ethan Ashby - Engineer
 Jordan Evans - Additional production

References

2017 albums
Sean Leon albums